This page lists diplomatic missions located in Northern Ireland, a constituent country within the United Kingdom.

Consulates General

Belfast
 
 
 

Comber

International Organisation

Belfast

See also
 Foreign relations of the United Kingdom
 List of diplomatic missions of the United Kingdom

References
Consular Corps/Association of Northern Ireland

 
Northern Ireland
United Kingdom
Diplomatic
Diplomatic missions